The LPGA Takefuji Classic was an annual golf tournament for professional female golfers on the LPGA Tour that took place every year from 2000 through 2006. Between 2000 and 2002 it was held at two different courses in Hawaii. Between 2003 and 2006 it was played at Las Vegas Country Club in Las Vegas, Nevada.

In August, 2006 the LPGA declined to renew the LPGA Takefuji Classic's spot on the 2007 LPGA Tour schedule.  In response the tournament operators posted this message on the official tournament web site:

"To all our volunteers, media, sponsors and spectators: thank you all for the support, time and effort you gave to help make the LPGA Takefuji Classic such a success during the last four years. We regret to inform you that the new Commissioner of the LPGA does not feel Las Vegas is a good market for the tour and we will not be continuing the tournament. We enjoyed working with you and wish you all the best."

The last tournament was held from April 10–15, 2006.

Winners

Tournament record

References

External links
LPGA official tournament microsite
Tournament results at Golfobserver.com

Former LPGA Tour events
Golf in Hawaii
Golf in Las Vegas
Recurring sporting events established in 2000
Recurring sporting events disestablished in 2006
2000 establishments in Hawaii
2006 disestablishments in Nevada
History of women in Hawaii
History of women in Nevada